Homo Erraticus is the sixth studio album by British progressive rock musician Ian Anderson, who is also the frontman of Jethro Tull. Released on 14 April 2014, Homo Erraticus is a concept album, loosely connected to Jethro Tull's Thick as a Brick (1972) and Anderson's Thick as a Brick 2 (2012), since it again credits the lyrics to the fictional character Gerald Bostock.

The album was released in four formats: as a double vinyl, a single CD, a CD + DVD collection, and an Amazon.com exclusive box set edition, containing the album on CD as well as three bonus discs.

Anderson and his band embarked on a promotional tour of the album, in which they performed the entire album for the first half of each show, and the best of Jethro Tull for the second half.

Musical style
Homo Erraticus is a progressive rock album which, according to Anderson, blends folk and medieval as well as heavy metal music styles. Stephen Thomas Erlewine of AllMusic called the album "as close to 1970s progressive rock as is possible in 2014".

Concept
The phrase Homo Erraticus is Latin for "wandering man", and the concept for the album builds tangentially upon the fictional narrative of Ian Anderson's recurring character Gerald Bostock, a literary child prodigy. Details of the album's fictional story are provided, but also slightly contradicted, by two official sources: the Jethro Tull website and the album's own promotional website.

The general backstory underlying the album is that, in the year 2014, poet Gerald Bostock, now in his early fifties, has recently discovered in his town's bookstore a "dusty, unpublished manuscript, written by local amateur historian Ernest T. Parritt, (1873 -1928)" which is entitled either "Homo Britanicus Erraticus" or "Homo erraticus (The St Cleve Chronicles)". Anderson claims that the album's lyrics are Bostock's resulting interpretation of Parritt's "illustrated document [which] summarises key historical elements of early civilisation in Britain and seems to prophesy future scenarios too". Apparently, two years before his death, Parritt began suddenly recalling visions of past-life experiences, attributed either to the fact that "Parritt had a traumatic fall from his horse" or "Parritt suffered from a recurrence of malaria, contracted during his Army days in India". In either case:

[Parritt] awoke with the overwhelming conviction of having enjoyed past lives as historical characters: a pre-history nomadic neolithic settler, an Iron Age blacksmith, a Saxon invader, a Christian monk, a Seventeenth Century grammar school boy, turnpike innkeeper, one of Brunel’s railroad engineers, and even Prince Albert, husband of Queen Victoria. This befuddled, delusional obsession extends to his prophecy of future events and his fantasy imaginings of lives yet to come.... Bostock has returned once again to lyric writing, basing his new effort on the Parritt papers and I [Anderson] have had the fun and frolics of setting all to music of Folk-Rock-Metal stylings.

Critical reception

The three and a half stars of AllMusic was positive, stating 'the contours of the compositions... recall classic Tull, so Homo Erraticus winds up satisfying'.

Track listing
All songs credited to Ian Anderson and Gerald Bostock. The album is divided into three sections – "Chronicles", "Prophecies" and "Revelations".

Personnel
Musicians
Ian Anderson – lead and backing vocals, flute, acoustic guitar
Florian Opahle – electric guitar
John O'Hara – piano, organ, keyboards, accordion
David Goodier – bass guitar
Scott Hammond – drums, percussion
Ryan O'Donnell– additional vocals

Production
Michael Downs - Recording Engineer
Jakko Jakszyk – mixing, mastering
Carl Glover – artwork, design, photography
Personnel per Discogs

Charts

References

Progressive rock albums by English artists
Ian Anderson albums
2014 albums
Kscope albums
Concept albums